Bara is a village in Rupnagar District in Punjab, India. Bara is the site of significant archeological excavations connected with the Indus Valley civilization. It has some evidence of being home to a culture (sometimes called Baran Culture) that was a pre-Harappan strand of the Indus Valley Civilization. Baran and Harappan cultures may have intertwined and coexisted in some places, such as Kotla Nihang Khan, also in modern-day Punjab.

See also
Kotla Nihang Khan
Bara culture or Baran Culture
Siswal
Chamkaur Sahib
Chandigarh - Tri-city
Kurali
Mohali

References

Bibliography
Excavation sites in Punjab Archaeological Survey of India

Indus Valley civilisation sites
Pre-Indus Valley civilisation sites
Cities and towns in Rupnagar district
Bara culture
Archaeological sites in Punjab, India